The  was commanded by three Japanese samurai generals serving Saitō clan during the Sengoku Period.

Ujiie Naotomo also known as Ujiie Bokuzen
Andō Morinari also known as Andō Michitari
Inaba Yoshimichi also known as Inaba Ittetsu

They had served under Saitō Dōsan, Saitō Yoshitatsu, Saitō Tatsuoki and later served under the command of Oda Nobunaga.

Notes

References
 Saitō clan
 Saitō Dōsan
 Oda Nobunaga
 Toyotomi Hideyoshi
 Shibata Katsuie

Samurai